Securidaca dolod is a species of flowering plant in the family Polygalaceae, native to Peru. It is a rainforest liana, reaching  into the canopy.

References

Polygalaceae
Endemic flora of Peru
Plants described in 1998